A by-election was held for the New South Wales Legislative Assembly electorate of The Hume on 10 September 1899 because William Lyne had been appointed Premier and Colonial Treasurer, forming the Lyne ministry. Until 1904, members appointed to a ministerial position were required to face a by-election. These were generally uncontested. Of the nine ministers appointed in the Lyne ministry, The Hume and Ashfield (Bernhard Wise) were the only electorates in which the by-election was contested.

Dates

Result

William Lyne was appointed Premier and Colonial Treasurer, forming the Lyne ministry.

See also
Electoral results for the district of Hume

References

1899 elections in Australia
New South Wales state by-elections
1890s in New South Wales